Costa Brava, Lebanon is a 2021 internationally co-produced drama film directed by Mounia Akl from a screenplay by Akl and Clara Roquet. It stars Nadine Labaki, Saleh Bakri, Nadia Charbel, Ceana Restom, Geana Restom, Liliane Chacar Khoury, Yumna Marwan and Francois Nour.

It had its world premiere at the 2021 Venice International Film Festival on September 5, 2021. It was selected as the Lebanese entry for the Best International Feature Film at the 94th Academy Awards. This film also nominated for New Talent Award at the Hong Kong Asian Film Festival 2021.

Plot
In a near future, Soraya and Walid build an idyllic life in the mountains, far from the disorder and pollution of Beirut, capital of Lebanon.    There, they live with one of their parents and their two children — until installation of a supposedly ecological landfill disrupts their harmony.

Cast
 Nadine Labaki as Soraya
 Saleh Bakri as Walid
 Nadia Charbel as Tala
 Ceana Restom as Rim
 Geana Restom as Rim
 Liliane Chacar Khoury
 Yumna Marwan
Francois Nour

Production
In July 2021, it was announced Nadine Labaki and Saleh Bakri had joined the cast of the film, with Mounia Akl, directing from a screenplay she wrote alongside Clara Roquet.

Release
The film premiered at the 2021 Venice International Film Festival on September 5, 2021. It was also screened at the 2021 Toronto International Film Festival on September 11, 2021. At TIFF, it won the NETPAC Prize. Screened at the 18th Seville European Film Festival (SEFF) on 7 November 2021, the film won the festival's Grand Jury Prize ex aequo with Onoda: 10,000 Nights in the Jungle. In June 2022, Kino Lorber acquired U.S. distribution rights to the film, and set it for a July 15, 2022, release.

Reception
On Rotten Tomatoes, the film holds an approval rating of 90% based on 29 reviews, with an average rating of 7.60/10.

See also
 List of submissions to the 94th Academy Awards for Best International Feature Film
 List of Lebanese submissions for the Academy Award for Best International Feature Film

References

External links
 

2021 films
2021 drama films
Qatari drama films
American drama films
Spanish drama films
Danish drama films
French drama films
Norwegian drama films
Swedish drama films
Lebanese drama films
Participant (company) films
2021 directorial debut films
2020s Arabic-language films
Films set in Lebanon
2020s American films
2020s French films